Exercise Green Dagger is a five-day military exercise held annually at the Marine Corps Air Ground Combat Center in Twentynine Palms in the Mojave Desert. It is attended by military forces from a number of countries including United States Marines, United Kingdom Royal Marines, Netherlands, United Arab Emirates and Canada.

References

External links 
 Marine Air Ground Task Force Training Command and Marine Corps Air Ground Combat Center

Military exercises involving the United States
History of the Mojave Desert region
United States Marine Corps in the 21st century